The Right to Love may refer to:

The Right to Love (1920 film), an American silent drama film directed by George Fitzmaurice
The Right to Love (1930 German film), 1930 drama German film directed by Luise Fleck
The Right to Love (1930 American film), a 1930 American drama film directed by Richard Wallace
The Right to Love (1939 film), 1939 German drama film directed by Joe Stöckel
Lush Life (Nancy Wilson album), a 1967 album by Nancy Wilson, reissued in 1970 as The Right to Love
The Right to Love (Liane Carroll album), 2017 album by Liane Carroll